Katriona Fairweather (born 24 May 1978) is a Scottish curler, a . In marriage she also known as Katriona Davidson.

Teams

References

External links

Living people
1978 births
Scottish female curlers
World curling champions
Scottish curling champions
Continental Cup of Curling participants